Three ships of the Royal Australian Navy (RAN) have been named HMAS Wollongong, after the city of Wollongong, New South Wales

, a Bathurst-class corvette launched in 1941 and sold to the Royal Netherlands Navy in 1946
, a Fremantle-class patrol boat launched in 1981, and decommissioned in 2005
, an Armidale-class patrol boat commissioned in 2007, and decommissioned in 2022

Battle honours
Ships named HMAS Wollongong are entitled to carry six battle honours:
Pacific 1942–45
Indian Ocean 1942–45
Sicily 1943
Mediterranean 1943
East Indies 1943
Okinawa 1945

References

Royal Australian Navy ship names